Statistics of Primera Fuerza in season 1907-08.

Overview
It was contested by four teams, and the British Club won the championship. It was the first Mexican championship title for British Football Club (Mexico City), whose players were almost exclusively British and where player-trainer Percy Clifford, centre half-back "Jack" Caldwall and the Hogg brothers were the most prominent characters.

British Club 1907–08 Champion squad

  John Easton
  Alexander Dewar
  Pierce Mennill
  Percy Clifford
  Bryan White
  John Johnson
  John Hogg
  Douglas Watson
  Stephen Crowder
  George Ratcliff
  John Caldwall
  Horace Hogg

League standings

Top goalscorers
Players sorted first by goals scored, then by last name.

References
Mexico - List of final tables (RSSSF)

1907-08
Mex
1907–08 in Mexican football